V. N. Tiwari (1936–1984) was an Indian author and parliamentarian. He wrote books in Punjabi, English and Hindi. He was nominated as member of the Rajya Sabha in 1982 and served till 1984.

Books
 Indian politics at the crossroads
 Punjab, a cultural
 Nehru and Indian literature
 The language of Chandigarh
Bhāī Wīra Siṅgha, sandarabha-kosha 
 Pañjābī te Pañjāba 
 Nānaka simarana
 Cuppa dī paiṛa
 Ikalla toṃ ikalla dā safara
 Kukkha dī corī

Family
Tiwari was married to Amrit Tewari. His son Manish Tewari is a member of the Indian National Congress and Member of Parliament from Anandpur Sahib constituency in Punjab. His son had also served as  the Minister of Information and Broadcasting in the government of India in UPA 2 government.

Awards
Tiwari won the Sahitya Akademi Award in 1981 for his poetry book Garaj Ton Footpath Teek.

Death
Tiwari was killed by suspected militants at Sector 24 Chandigarh while on a morning walk in 1984.

References

Nominated members of the Rajya Sabha
1936 births
1984 deaths
People from Punjab, India
Victims of the insurgency in Punjab
People murdered in Chandigarh
Victims of Sikh terrorism
Recipients of the Sahitya Akademi Award in Punjabi
Punjabi-language writers